Virginia Ruano Pascual and Paola Suárez were the two-time defending champions, but they were defeated in the second round by Anna Chakvetadze and Elena Vesnina.

Lisa Raymond and Samantha Stosur won the title, defeating Daniela Hantuchová and Ai Sugiyama in the final 6–3, 6–2. With the victory, Raymond completed the career Grand Slam in Women's Doubles.

Schedule

Seeds

Draw

Finals

Top half

Section 1

Section 2

Bottom half

Section 3

Section 4

External links
2006 French Open – Women's draws and results at the International Tennis Federation

Women's Doubles
French Open by year – Women's doubles
2006 in women's tennis
2006 in French women's sport